The Pathans are a large Urdu-speaking Indian Muslim community in the Uttar Pradesh state in India, who form one of the largest Muslim communities in the state. They are also known as Khans, which is a commonly used surname amongst them, although not all those who use the surname are Pathans, for example the Khanzada community of eastern Uttar Pradesh, are also commonly known as Khan. Indeed, in Awadh, the boundary between the Khanzada and Pathans are blurred. In addition, the phrase Pathan Khanzada is used to describe Muslim Rajput groups, found mainly in Gorakhpur, who have been absorbed into the Pathan community. However, in the Rohilkhand region, and in parts of the Doab and Awadh regions, there are communities of partial Pashtun ancestry, such as the agricultural farmers community of Rohilla.

History
Many Pashtuns emigrated from their homeland of Afghanistan to what is now northern India during the Mughal Empire. Many of them were traders, soldiers and civil servants during the British Raj era. A process of indigenization has occurred, and the Pathan community became indistinguishable from neighbouring Muslim communities due to social factors such as assmilation as well as intermarriage with the local castes. They now speak Hindustani (Khari Boli) as well as various localised dialects of the language such as Awadhi, Braj Bhasha and Kannauji and are found throughout Uttar Pradesh with settlements in Moradabad, Farrukhabad, Hathras, Malihabad and a dense population of them found in the Rohillkhand region. In addition, a significant amount of them are found in parts of Azamgarh, Sultanpur and Jaunpur. 

The Pathan are divided into sixteen groupings, who generally take their name from the ancestral Pashtun tribes. These include the Bangash, Afridi, Dustukhel, Tanoli, Luni (Miani), Jadoon, Bakarzai, Barech, Daudzai, Dilazak, Durrani, Ghorghushti, Toia Mehsud Khel, Ghori, Khalil, Lodi, Mohmand, Mohammadzai, Orakzai, Rohilla, Sherwani, Suri, Sultani and Yousafzai, all of which are well known Pashtun tribes. A further differentiation exists based on an identity known as the qabila or biradari, based on territorial subgroupings and community ties. In older parts of the Muslim areas of the towns in UP, the Pathan have maintained their own residential neighbourhoods. The Pathan are not an endogamous group and arranged marriages do occur with other Sunni Muslim communities of similar social status, such as the Mughal and Muslim Rajput, although there is still a preference of marriage within the community. In Rohilkhand, they are still a community associated with agriculture, having historically been a community of land owners. 

The Pathan have also been prominent in the Muslim religious sphere in UP, having produced many Ulama and Huffaz and have built and have financed many Mosques and Madrasahs which were established by this community. In terms of formal education, they are seen as a Muslim community that has a favourable attitude towards education, and many are now in professional occupations, such as medical and the legal fields.

Pathans of Lucknow in Western Uttar Pradesh

Most Pathans of Lucknow are settled in Malihabad district in which there are Afridi Pathans, Yousafzai and Bangash, whereby the Pathans of Malihabad worked as agricultural landowners of mangoes that are famous internationally through the ownership of extensive orchards. The Afridi of Malihabad are known throughout as expert mango growers.

Pathans in Western Uttar Pradesh

The Pathan population in the Doab, with the exception of Kasganj, Kaimganj, Saraiaghat, Amanabad and Farrukhabad, Lucknow is fairly thin on the ground. The upper Doab, a region roughly covering an area from Aligarh to Saharanpur is home mainly to the Ranghar, Muslim Gujjar, and Muley Jat communities. However, the region is still home to a number of Pathan settlements. Starting with Saharanpur District, the Pathan population is found mainly in the city and villages nearby. The only large Pathan colony is that of the Kakars in Deoband tehsil, where there are several villages. There is also a very ancient settlement of Ghori Afghans in Roorkee, and settlements of Lodis in Saharanpur tehsil, and Yousafzais in Nakur. In addition to these, the district is also home to small numbers of Mohammadzais, Tareens, Durranis (mainly Barakzais and Achakzais), Bangash, Khalils and Afridis.

Deoband town itself has small communities of Yusufzais in Mohalla Qila and Kakars in Mohalla Pathan Pura. Until 1947, Mohalla Qila was predominantly a Pathan area and also houses a mosque, known as Masjid-e-Qila or Qila Wali Masjid, built by the Pathan King Sikander Bahlol Lodhi in the year 616 AH (1219 AD).

The mosque is still managed and administered by Yusufzais believed to be the descendents of Sajid Khan, the then ruler of the area. Like the Pathans of other parts of western Uttar Pradesh, Kakars and Yusufzais of Deoband were either small zamindars, served in the armed forces, the police force or were involved in transportation and logistical business.

In neighbouring Muzaffarnagar District, the Pathan settlements are found mainly in a tract between the Hindan and Kali rivers, there is a cluster of villagers known as the Bara Basti. These Pathan are for the most part belong to the Daudzai and Lodi tribes. Further west, the Kakar of what is known as the Bawan Basti were at one time substantial landowners. They are of the same stock as the Kakar of Deoband tehsil in neighbouring Saharanpur District. There is also a settlement of Afridis north of the town of Thana Bhawan, who were settled by the Mughal Emperor Aurangzeb to control the turbulent Ranghars of the region. Their main settlement is the village of Jalalabad.

In Meerut District, including Baghpat, the Pathan are found throughout these two districts. They belong for the most part to the Yousafzai and Ghori tribe. The city of Meerut has been said to be the earliest settlement of the Pashtuns in North India, and the Ghori have been settled for at least eight hundred years. Other Pathan tribes in the district include the Kakar, Bangash, Tareen and Afridi.

The district of Bulandshahr is home to a number of important Pathan colonies. Perhaps the most important settlement is that of the city of Khurja. The Keshgis of Khurja were brought over from Kasur in Punjab by Firuz Shah Tughlaq. They are often referred to as Kasuria, on account of that being their original settlement in India. There also exists a barah basti, or twelve towns of Lodi Pathans near the banks of the Ganges. These Pathans are connected through marriage with the larger Pathan settlement in Rohilkhand, across the river. The Pathans of the Barah-Basti villages of Bulandshahr produced a large number of volunteers who joined the British Irregular Cavalry, many of whom rebelled during the Indian Rebellion of 1857 under Abdul Latif Khan of Khanpur and Walidad Khan of Malagarh. The Pathans of Malakpur, who are Yousafzai were settled their by the Emperor Akbar. In additions to these communities, there are also settlements of Afridis, in the city of Bulandshahr, as well as Bangash.

The Pathans in Aligarh District belong to a number of clans, perhaps the most important from a historic point are the Sherwani of Bhikampur and Datauli, in Aligarh tehsil. These Sherwani were substantial landowners, and were practically independent rulers in the period between the collapse of Mughal power and the rise of the British. Their oldest settlement is at Jalali, which contains several families of Lodis and Ghoris. The Popolzai Durani of the village of Barla were settled their by Ahmed Shah Abdali. In the city of Aligarh, there are settlements of Yousafzais and Mohammadzais. Other Pathan settlements include the Lodis in Sikandra Rao, the Afridis in Khair and the Ghoris in Atrauli.

Pathans of Saharanpur

There are many settlements of various tribes of Pashtuns in the district of Saharanpur. Khanalampura colony in the city came in to existence before the city at the banks of Paun Dhoi river.

In Saharanpur district, there are more than fifty villages and colonies where Kakar Pathans are living from the Mughal period which is called Kakro Ki Bawni means fifty two villages of Kakar Pathans in Hindustani. Some are Khera Afghan, Titro, Ambehta Peer, Dhurala, Jajwa, Papri, Nagla Jhanda (Jhandia), Sansarpur, Harpal, Pathed, Chaura Kalan, Pithori, Sarsawa, Deoband, Nakur, Kairana, Kailashpur, Nanauta etc. where Nakur Deoband and Sarsawa also have a significant population of Yusufzais among the Pathans and the city has considerable population of various type of Pathans from different tribes. Mansoor Ali Khan, an ex-member of parliament from the Saharanpur Lok Sabha seat, is a Kakar Pathan and his father Mahmood Ali Khan had been elected as an MLA several times.

Pathans of Aliganj and Kasganj

The most important Pathan colonies in the Doab are that of Aliganj and Kasganj, both in Etah District. These Pathans belong mainly to the Lodi tribe, but there are also important settlements of Ghoris, Mohammadzais and Yousafzais. Both the settlements of Aliganj and Kasganj were founded by a Yaqut Khan. Yaqut Khan is said to have invited Pathans to settle in these two towns. A further settlement was founded at Kadirganj and Sajawar. Most of the early settlers belonged to the Lodi tribe, who still form the largest sub-group. In addition to these settlements, Bhai Khan Toiakhel, a courtier of the Bangash Nawab of Farrukhabad founded the village of Sarai Aghat in which the still settlement of Toiakhel Pathans, another name of this tribe is Toia Mahsud Khel and this tribe is a sub-tribe of both Mehsud and Waziri tribes.

A common ancestor, Shahbaz Khan came to India from Afghanistan in 1680.

Pathans of Lucknow District 
The district of Lucknow is a home to a number of Pathan communities, most found in towns referred to locally as kasbas, such as Malihabad. In the city of Lucknow, there are communities of Mohmands, Shinwari, Yousafzais, Lodi, Bangash and Ghori Pathans. While in the district, the Pathans are found mainly in the kasbas of Malihabad, Mirzaganj, Bhaktiyarnagar, Khalispur, Malakpur Badi Garhi, Rasoolpur and Garhi Sanjar Khan. Unlike other Uttar Pradesh Pathans who are predominantly Sunni Muslims, a large significant number are Shia Muslims. Among the oldest settlers are the Bazid Khel Pathans of Jowaki Division of Adam Khel clan who are an Afridi tribe from Kohat mentioned in several historical records including the Gazetteer of the Kohat District, published in 1883–84.

The Garhi Sanjar Pathans belong to the Amazai clan of the Jadoon tribe. They claim descent from Daler Khan Amazai, who arrived in Awadh in 1656. Daler Khan, also known as Jalal Khan Jadoon, was appointed governor of Awadh. Daler Khan brought with him two brothers, Kawal Khan and Khan Bahadur Khan. They settled initially in Bulakinager, while the son of Khan Bahadur Khan, Sarmast Khan founded the settlement of Garhi Sanjar Khan. The Jadoons are now found mainly in Bulakanagar, Bhakitiyarnagar, and Garhu Sanjar Khan.

The Malihabad Pathan belong mainly to the Jowaki Khel Afridis and Shinwari tribe, and were settled in the district during the rule of Nawab Shuja-ud-Daula. Their ancestor was Faqir Mohammad Khan, who sought service under the Nawabs of Awadh. He brought with him members of his tribe, and they now form an important element in Malihabad's Muslim population.

The Hotakis of Khalispur claim descent from Yousaf Khan Qandhahari, who settled during the rule of Shuja-ud-Daula, who was the grandson of Yahya Khan, who was one of the brothers of the King of Afghanistan, Mir Wais Hotak and Yusuf Khan was the real son-in-law of Mir Wais Hotak. Yusuf Khan was granted the village of Khalispur as an jagir. He is said to have brought his kinsmen from present-day Afghanistan, and a village now contains a large settlement of Durranis.

In neighbouring Barabanki district, the town of Fatehpur is also an important centre of the Pathans in Awadh. The town was founded by a Fateh Khan, who was a Pathan, in 1321. As a frontier settlement, with the countryside still held by Hindu chiefs, Fateh Khan established a colony of Pathans. They belong mainly to the Yousafzai and Lodi tribes. In addition to the Fatehpur Pathans, there are also settlements in Ramsanehighat tehsil, belonging mainly to the Afridi and Shinwari tribe.

Distribution of tribes by district in Awadh 1891

Notes

See also
 Urdu-speaking people
 Rohilla
 Pashtun
 Pathans of Madhya Pradesh
 Pathan of Bihar
 Pathans of Gujarat
 Pathans of Rajasthan
 Pathans of Punjab

References

External links
 A Dictionary of Pathan Tribes

Muslim communities of Uttar Pradesh
Rohilla
Muslim communities of India
Uttar Pradesh